The Makilala–Allah Valley Road, is a  two-to-four lane highway in the Philippines that connects the provinces of North Cotabato, Maguindanao, and Sultan Kudarat. It is classified as a national primary highway for Mindanao. It also connects to the Maharlika Highway in Tacurong City. It lessens the travel time from North Cotabato to Sultan Kudarat.

The entire highway is designated as National Route 76 (N76) of the Philippine highway network.

Route description

Makilala to Datu Paglas 
The eastern section of N76 is at Makilala that links up to N75. It traverses the municipalities of M'lang and Tulunan in North Cotabato.

Datu Paglas to Tacurong 
At Datu Paglas, there is a roundabout that links N76 into a national tertiary highway, Datu Paglas–Columbio Road. It traverses into the municipalities of Buluan and Mangudadatu.

Tacurong to Isulan 
At Tacurong, there is a roundabout that links to N940 and AH26.

Intersections

References 

Roads in Cotabato
Roads in Maguindanao del Sur
Roads in Sultan Kudarat